Léo Walter (born 14 April 1972 in Amiens) is a French politician from La France Insoumise. He is the deputy for Alpes-de-Haute-Provence's 2nd constituency in the National Assembly of France, elected 
in the 2022 French legislative election.

Biography
Married and father of three children, he lives in Niozelles.  

He was a teacher and school principal. After working for seven years in schools in the northern districts of Marseille, he moved to Alpes-de-Haute-Provence, where he was director of the Revest-du-Bion school, which had two classes, one primary, which he taught, and a kindergarten. He is a member of the  union.

He is the brother of Emmanuelle Walter, editor-in-chief of the website Arrêt sur images.

External Links

 His page on the site of the National Assembly

References

Deputies of the 16th National Assembly of the French Fifth Republic
Living people
1972 births
La France Insoumise politicians
21st-century French politicians